Time for Annihilation: On the Record & On the Road is the first live album by the American rock band Papa Roach. It was released on August 31, 2010. Jerry Horton said in a blog on the band's official website that they recorded it on the last run of the tour with Shinedown. Later, Jacoby Shaddix reported on the site that five entirely new tracks had been written and would be studio recorded and released with the Time for Annihilation album. The first single, "Kick in the Teeth", was released on June 22, 2010. The album's name is a lyric quote from the song "Crash" from the band's 2006 album, The Paramour Sessions.

Background 
In January 2010, the band also said on their website that they would release "Big News" soon. In February, Jerry Horton confirmed that the "Big News" was the announcement of a live album, which they recorded during five shows of their 2009 co-headlining tour with Shinedown. They were also recording five new songs for it, making it a combination of a studio and a live album.

In March, Shaddix said he was recording vocals for songs called "Nemesis" and "No Matter What". That month, the band also released the teaser for the live album, confirming the release date to be in summer 2010. In June, on Nikki Sixx's radio show, Sixx Sense, Shaddix confirmed that one of the new songs was called "One Track Mind". The song was previously titled "Nemesis" but was changed to "One Track Mind" after he changed the chorus.

On June 29, the band's former label, Geffen Records, released a greatest hits compilation of the band's biggest hits, titled ...To Be Loved: The Best of Papa Roach. The band, however, told fans not to buy it.

In an interview with Upvenue, Tobin Esperance explained that Time for Annihilation  was really just the end of a decade of Papa Roach. "We put out five major label, full-length records, and we were transitioning from a major label, going independent, and we wanted to do something different [...] we'd always talked about doing a live record, and it turned into 'let's add a couple of bonus songs' [...] and now it's half live, half new songs and it's kind of the past and present of Papa Roach, and I think it's a good representation and a good reminder of what this band's about, [...] and it gives you a look at where our sound can go."

Hidden message
On the album there is a special message recorded by Shaddix, at the last 0:39 of "Last Resort (Live)". The message encourages fans to help fight homelessness and hunger. He asks fans to take out their phones and to text a number to WhyHunger to donate $5 to them.

Track listing

UK edition

UK edition DVD

Personnel
 Jacoby Shaddix - lead vocals
 Jerry Horton - guitar, backing vocals
 Tobin Esperance - bass guitar, backing vocals
 Tony Palermo - drums

Charts

References

Papa Roach albums
2010 live albums
Eleven Seven Label Group live albums